The Salvation Army Building may refer to:

The Salvation Army Building (Pittsburgh, Pennsylvania)
International Headquarters of The Salvation Army
Wrigley Lodge, a building in Chicago, Illinois, also known as the Salvation Army Building
Salvation Army Headquarters (Saint Paul, Minnesota)